Mordechai (Motke) Maklef (or Makleff) (1920–1978) was the third Chief of Staff of the Israel Defense Forces (IDF) and later, director-general of many important public companies in the Israeli economy.

Early life
Makleff was born in the village of Motza, near Jerusalem in the British Mandate of Palestine in 1920. His parents were among the founders of this first modern village outside Jerusalem, located along the road to Jaffa. During the 1929 Palestine riots, inhabitants of the neighbouring Arab village of Qalunya attacked the Makleff home, which was located along the perimeter of Motza, and killed the entire family, except the young Mordechai, who managed to escape the massacre by jumping from a second story window. The murderers included a shepherd employed by the family and the local policeman, who was the only person in the area to own a gun. The murder shocked the Jewish population of Palestine, and was one of the most remembered rioting events. With his immediate family now dead, Mordechai Makleff was raised by relatives in Jerusalem and Haifa.

Military career
As a teen, Makleff was active in the Haganah and in Orde Wingate's Night Raiders unit. With the outbreak of World War II, he enlisted in the Palestine Regiment of the British Army and fought in the North African and Italian campaigns. He was commissioned from the rank of sergeant in July 1942. Upon his release from the army with the rank of major in August 1946, he remained in Europe, engaged in illegal Jewish immigration to Palestine and acquiring arms for the emerging Jewish state. He later returned to Palestine and rejoined the Haganah.

During the 1948 Arab-Israeli War, Makleff fought in the Carmeli Brigade, as its senior operation officer and later as brigade commander, participating in battles near Haifa and Acre. He also took part in Operation Hiram, in which Jewish forces captured the entire Galilee region for Israel. After the war, he headed the Israeli delegation to talks with Lebanon and Syria. In November 1949, he was appointed Deputy Chief of Staff to Yigael Yadin and senior operations officer of the IDF. Following Yadin's resignation in 1952, Makleff, then just 32 years old, was appointed to replace him as Chief of Staff. He agreed to accept the position for a period of one year only. His tenure as Chief of Staff was marked by his battles with the Ministry of Defence, and in particular with Shimon Peres. David Ben-Gurion commented in his diary "I had the clear impression that M. suffered from an inferiority complex and suspected that his authority was being undermined". Makleff resigned on 11 October 1953, after repeated demands that relations between the army and the Ministry of Defence be reformed.

During that time, Israel was faced with increasing attacks from fedayeen, Palestinian raiders from the West Bank and Gaza Strip, who attacked Israeli border settlements. In response to this, Makleff appointed Major Ariel Sharon to form a commando unit to attack the fedayeen bases across the border and put an end to the attacks on Israeli civilians. Sharon, in turn, created Unit 101, which conducted a lengthy series of retaliatory raids throughout 1953, when it was merged into the Paratroopers Brigade.

He was also responsible for the establishing of Unit 131 which set up clandestine cells in Arab states to be activated in the event of war. A year later, the cell in Egypt was exposed in events that led to the Lavon Affair.

Civilian career
On 7 December 1953, exactly one year after he assumed the position, Maklef resigned as Chief of Staff. He went on to serve in a number of key positions in the Israeli public sector. From 1955 to 1968, he was Director General of the Dead Sea Works, developing the local phosphate industry in that region. He also served as Director General of the Citrus Marketing Board and Israel Chemicals.

Maklef died from a heart attack in Germany in 1978, and was buried in the military cemetery in Kiryat Shaul, Israel.

References

1920 births
1978 deaths
British Army personnel of World War II
British Army soldiers
Jews in Mandatory Palestine
Palestine Regiment officers
People from Jerusalem
Mandatory Palestine military personnel of World War II
Jewish Brigade personnel
Burials at Kiryat Shaul Cemetery